"Just Another Day" is a song by American rock singer John Mellencamp. It was released on February 4, 1997, as the second single from his 14th studio album, Mr. Happy Go Lucky (1996), and became Mellencamp's final number-one hit in Canada. In the United States, it reached number 46 on the Billboard Hot 100.

Critical reception
Larry Flick, of Billboard magazine reviewed the song favorably, calling it a "richly atmospheric blend of acoustic rhythms and raw pop-rock power."

Music video
The music video was directed by Samuel Bayer and premiered on November 20, 1996.

Charts

Weekly charts

Year-end charts

References

John Mellencamp songs
1996 songs
1997 singles
Mercury Records singles
Music videos directed by Samuel Bayer
RPM Top Singles number-one singles
Songs written by John Mellencamp